The 1983 Omloop Het Volk was the 38th edition of the Omloop Het Volk cycle race and was held on 5 March 1983. The race started and finished in Ghent. The race was won by Alfons De Wolf.

General classification

References

1983
Omloop Het Nieuwsblad
Omloop Het Nieuwsblad
March 1983 sports events in Europe
1983 Super Prestige Pernod